MS5, or similar, may refer to:
 Beriev MS-5, a Soviet flying boat
 Matra MS5, a racing car
 Metal Slug 5, a video game
 Mississippi's 5th congressional district
 Mississippi Highway 5
 Manga Studio 5, comics and manga creation software
 Season 5 of the American TV show The Masked Singer